Nevada's 11th Senate district is one of 21 districts in the Nevada Senate. It has  been represented by Democrat Dallas Harris since her appointment in 2018, succeeding fellow Democrat Aaron Ford.

Geography
District 11 is located in the Las Vegas Valley in Clark County, including parts of Enterprise, Spring Valley, Paradise, and Las Vegas proper.

The district overlaps with Nevada's 1st and 3rd congressional districts, and with the 8th and 42nd districts of the Nevada Assembly.

Recent election results
Nevada Senators are elected to staggered four-year terms; since 2012 redistricting, the 11th district has held elections in presidential years.

2020

2016

2012

Federal and statewide results in District 11

References 

11
Clark County, Nevada